The Qualified Adventurer  is a 1925 British silent adventure film directed by Sinclair Hill and starring Matheson Lang, Genevieve Townsend and Fred Raynham. It was based on the 1922 novel The Qualified Adventurer by Selwyn Jepson.

Cast
 Matheson Lang as Peter Duff 
 Genevieve Townsend as Jimmy Fellowes 
 Fred Raynham as Northcote 
 Kiyoshi Takase as Yen San 
 Cameron Carr as Weames 
 Nelson Ramsey as McNab 
 Moore Marriott as Bosun 
 Wyndham Guise as Captain Fellowes 
 Dave O'Toole as Evans

References

Bibliography
 Low, Rachael. History of the British Film, 1918-1929. George Allen & Unwin, 1971.

External links

1925 films
1925 adventure films
British silent feature films
Films directed by Sinclair Hill
Films based on British novels
Stoll Pictures films
Films shot at Cricklewood Studios
British black-and-white films
British adventure films
1920s English-language films
1920s British films
Silent adventure films